Anoratha albitibita is a moth of the family Erebidae first described by Wileman and West in 1930. It is found on Luzon in the Philippines.

The wingspan is about 50 mm.

References

Moths described in 1930
Hypeninae
Moths of Asia